was a Japanese video game developer, founded in April 1989. The company name is derived from musical terminology, as well as five elements of game design—planning, graphics, sound, programming and producing. Quintet was most active in the 1990s, when it had a strong relationship with Enix (now incorporated into Square Enix); the company was also a member of the GD-NET group of Sega Saturn developers. Quintet has not been active since the 2000s and are likely defunct.

Company overview
The director and president of Quintet is Tomoyoshi Miyazaki, the scenario writer for the first three entries of Nihon Falcom's Ys series. Masaya Hashimoto, who served as main director, designer and programmer for the same early Ys titles, also joined Quintet with Miyazaki. Thanks to the Ys connection, composer Yuzo Koshiro (also a Ys veteran) lent his talents to the score of the company's official inaugural title, ActRaiser, a soundtrack which has since been adapted for orchestra. Koshiro's sister, Ayano Koshiro, drew the character designs.

The releases of Soul Blazer, Illusion of Gaia and Terranigma, also known as the "Soul Blazer Trilogy", were well-received by some fans for the broad philosophical and sometimes dark themes addressed in the titles. Quintet's games frequently revolve around a conflict between a being that brings destruction and a being that controls creation as symbols of duality. The world has two aspects which both oppose and complement each other, and everything in existence is built upon that relationship. Portrayals of suffering and sacrifices set Quintet games apart from other games of the era, and made the games memorable to fans.  

The company appears to have been inactive since 2002. There was an active bulletin board on the official site until March 29, 2002 (the release date of the Game Boy Advance action RPG Magical Houshin, the counterpart to the GameCube title Battle Houshin, released as Mystic Heroes in North America). In response to comments from fans impatient by the lack of news, Quintet staff posted:  Afterwards, the bulletin board was shut down. In March 2008, Quintet's website was also shut down.

A fan-led effort to encourage a re-release or remaster of Terranigma in 2021 led to renewed speculation on the status of the rights to Quintet's games. According to Terranigma artist Kamui Fujiwara, Quintet president Tomoyoshi Miyazaki had "disappeared" to his knowledge; he speculated this was why the rights to republish the game were complicated, that Miyazaki was not available for contact. A remaster of ActRaiser entitled ActRaiser Renaissance was released in September 2021 by Square Enix, suggesting that Square Enix at least has access to ActRaisers rights, and might have the rest of Quintet's library as well.

Works developed

References

External links
The Quintet Homepage - Internet Archive

Defunct video game companies of Japan
Japanese companies established in 1989
Video game companies established in 1989
Video game development companies